Karimabad-e Eskandari (also Romanized as Karīmābād-e Eskandarī; also known as Karīmābād) is a village in Sheshdeh Rural District, Sheshdeh and Qarah Bulaq District, Fasa County, Fars Province, Iran. At the 2006 census, its population was 160, in 35 families.

References 

Populated places in Fasa County